This list of botanical gardens and arboretums in Kansas is intended to include all significant botanical gardens and arboretums in the U.S. state of Kansas

See also 
List of botanical gardens and arboretums in the United States

References 

 
Arboreta in Kansas
botanical gardens and arboretums in Kansas